American singer Jennifer Rush has released eleven studio albums, thirteen compilation albums, and thirty-four singles.

Rush initially performed under her birth name Heidi Stern and released one studio album in 1979 which did not chart. In the early 1980s, she signed with CBS Records and released her debut single "Tonight" in 1982, which also did not chart. In 1983, she changed her stage name to Jennifer Rush and released her first two singles "Into My Dreams" and "Come Give Me Your Hand". The following year, she made her chart breakthrough with her debut studio album, Jennifer Rush, which included the German top-40 singles "25 Lovers" and "Ring of Ice", as well as "The Power of Love", which topped several charts worldwide and became the best-selling single of 1985 in the United Kingdom and the most successful single of 1986 in Canada. The Jennifer Rush album reached top-10 positions worldwide and achieved platinum and multi-platinum certifications in Germany, Canada, New Zealand, Norway, Sweden and the United Kingdom.

In 1985, Rush released her second album, Movin', which topped the German Albums Chart for 13 consecutive weeks and was certified triple platinum. The album also topped the charts in Norway, Sweden and Switzerland, achieving a Platinum certification in the latter. Two singles were released from the album, "Destiny" and "If You're Ever Gonna Lose My Love", which reached the Top 10 and Top 30 on the German singles chart respectively. Rush's third album, Heart over Mind, was released in 1987 and was another chart-topping album in Germany and stayed at the summit for nine consecutive weeks. Three German Top 40 hits were released from the album; "I Come Undone", "Flames of Paradise" (a duet with Elton John) and "Heart over Mind". The album reached the top 10 in multiple European territories, including Austria, Finland, Norway, Sweden, and Switzerland, where it became her second number-one album and her third platinum-certified album.

Rush's 1988 album Passion is her last platinum-certified album to date in Germany, peaking at number three and spawning a top-40 entry with "You're My One and Only". Her fifth album, 1989's Wings of Desire was less successful than her previous releases but attained a Top 20 peak in Germany and Switzerland, achieving a Gold certification in both countries. The same year, Rush achieved a UK top-40 entry with "Till I Loved You", a duet with Placido Domingo. The following year, CBS released Rush's first greatest hits album, The Power of Jennifer Rush, which reached number 40 in Germany and was eventually certified platinum.

In the 1990s, Rush signed with EMI and released four more studio albums during this decade. Her 1992 album Jennifer Rush reached the Top 40 in Germany and Switzerland but did not attain any certifications. Her next album, 1995's Out of My Hands, saw an improved chart performance, peaking at number 15 in Germany, becoming her highest-charting album of the decade in that country. The album also spawned her highest-charting 1990s single, "Tears in the Rain". 1997's Credo reached the top 30 in Germany, while 1998's Classics, a collection of classical re-recordings of Rush's 1980s singles with four new songs, peaked in the top 40.

Rush's tenth studio album, Now Is the Hour, was released in 2010, becoming her highest-charting album in Germany since Out of My Hands.

Albums

Studio albums
{| class="wikitable plainrowheaders" style="text-align:center;"
|+ List of studio albums, with selected chart positions and certifications
! scope="col" rowspan="2" style="width:11em;"| Title
! scope="col" rowspan="2" style="width:17em;"| Details
! scope="col" colspan="10"| Peak chart position
! scope="col" rowspan="2"| Certifications
|-
! scope="col" style="width:2.5em;font-size:90%;"| US
! scope="col" style="width:2.5em;font-size:90%;"| AUS
! scope="col" style="width:2.5em;font-size:90%;"| AUT
! scope="col" style="width:2.5em;font-size:90%;"| CAN
! scope="col" style="width:2.5em;font-size:90%;"| FIN
! scope="col" style="width:2.5em;font-size:90%;"| GER
! scope="col" style="width:2.5em;font-size:90%;"| NOR
! scope="col" style="width:2.5em;font-size:90%;"| SWE
! scope="col" style="width:2.5em;font-size:90%;"| SWI
! scope="col" style="width:2.5em;font-size:90%;"| UK
|-
! scope="row"| Heidi
|
 Released: 1979
 Label: Music Is Medicine
 Formats: LP, CD
| — || — || — || — || — || — || — || — || — || —
|
|-
! scope="row"| Jennifer Rush
|
 Released: October 1984
 Label: CBS
 Formats: LP, CD, cassette
| rowspan="2"| —{{efn|group=upper-alpha|name=debut|In some countries, the Jennifer Rush debut album was a cross-section of Jennifer Rush and Movin', either titled Jennifer Rush (United States, Canada, East Germany) or Movin''' (Venezuela).}} || 10 || 5 || rowspan="2"| 9 || 6 || 2 || 1 || 2 || 3 || 7
|
 BPI: Platinum
 BVMI: 2× Platinum
 IFPI NOR: Platinum
 IFPI SWI: Platinum
 MC: Platinum
|-
! scope="row"| Movin'|
 Released: October 1985
 Label: CBS
 Formats: LP, CD, cassette
| 96 || 8 || 9 || 1 || 1 || 1 || 1 || 32
|
 BVMI: 3× Platinum
 IFPI SWI: Platinum
|-
! scope="row"| Heart over Mind|
 Released: February 13, 1987
 Label: CBS
 Formats: LP, CD, cassette
| 118 || — || 9 || 33 || 7 || 1 || 6 || 4 || 1 || 48
|
 BVMI: 2× Platinum
 GLF: Platinum
 IFPI SWI: Platinum
 MC: Gold
|-
! scope="row"| Passion|
 Released: November 1988
 Label: CBS
 Formats: LP, CD, cassette
| — || — || 24 || — || 14 || 3 || — || 10 || 4 || —
|
 BVMI: Platinum
 IFPI SWI: Gold
|-
! scope="row"| Wings of Desire|
 Released: November 27, 1989
 Label: CBS
 Formats: LP, CD, cassette
| — || — || — || — || 37 || 12 || — || 18 || 13 || —
|
 BVMI: Gold
 IFPI SWI: Gold
|-
! scope="row"| Jennifer Rush|
 Released: October 30, 1992
 Label: EMI
 Formats: LP, CD, cassette
| — || — || 40 || — || — || 35 || — || — || 38 || —
|
|-
! scope="row"| Out of My Hands|
 Released: February 9, 1995
 Label: EMI
 Formats: CD, cassette
| — || — || 30 || — || — || 15 || — || — || 28 || —
|
|-
! scope="row"| Credo|
 Released: 24 March 1997
 Label: EMI
 Formats: CD, cassette
| — || — || 37 || — || — || 26 || — || — || — || —
|
|-
! scope="row"| Classics|
 Released: 9 November 1998
 Label: EMI
 Formats: CD, cassette
| — || — || — || — || — || 34 || — || — || — || —
|
|-
! scope="row"| Now Is the Hour|
 Released: 5 March 2010
 Label: Sony Music
 Formats: CD, digital download
| — || — || 51 || — || — || 21 || — || — || 61 || —
|
|-
| colspan="13" style="font-size:90%"| "—" denotes a recording that did not chart or was not released in that territory.
|}

Compilation albums

Singles
{| class="wikitable plainrowheaders" style="text-align:center;"
|+ List of singles, with selected chart positions and certifications, showing year released and album name
|-
! scope="col" rowspan="2"| Title
! scope="col" rowspan="2" style="width:1em;"| Year
! scope="col" colspan="10"| Peak chart positions
! scope="col" rowspan="2"| Certifications
! style="width:15em;" scope="col" rowspan="2"| Album
|-
! scope="col" style="width:2.5em;font-size:90%;"| US
! scope="col" style="width:2.5em;font-size:90%;"| AUS
! scope="col" style="width:2.5em;font-size:90%;"| AUT
! scope="col" style="width:2.5em;font-size:90%;"| CAN
! scope="col" style="width:2.5em;font-size:90%;"| FIN
! scope="col" style="width:2.5em;font-size:90%;"| GER
! scope="col" style="width:2.5em;font-size:90%;"| NZ
! scope="col" style="width:2.5em;font-size:90%;"| NOR
! scope="col" style="width:2.5em;font-size:90%;"| SWI
! scope="col" style="width:2.5em;font-size:90%;"| UK
|-
! scope="row"| "Tonight"
| 1982
| —
| —
| —
| —
| —
| —
| —
| —
| —
| —
|
| 
|-
! scope="row"| "Into My Dreams"
| rowspan="2"| 1983
| —
| —
| —
| —
| —
| —
| —
| —
| —
| —
|
| rowspan="5"| Jennifer Rush|-
! scope="row"| "Come Give Me Your Hand"
| —
| —
| —
| —
| —
| —
| —
| —
| —
| —
|
|-
! scope="row"| "25 Lovers"
| rowspan="2"| 1984
| —
| —
| —
| —
| —
| 25
| —
| —
| —
| —
|
|-
! scope="row"| "Ring of Ice"
| —
| —
| —
| —
| 15
| 22
| —
| —
| —
| 14
|
|-
! scope="row"| "The Power of Love"
| rowspan="2"| 1985
| 57
| 1
| 1
| 1
| 6
| 16
| 1
| 1
| 3
| 1
|
 BPI: Platinum
 MC: Gold
|-
! scope="row"| "Destiny"
| —
| —
| 5
| —
| —
| 4
| —
| —
| 5
| 96
|
| rowspan="3"| Movin'|-
! scope="row"| "If You're Ever Gonna Lose My Love"
| rowspan="4"| 1986
| —
| —
| 15
| —
| 19
| 24
| —
| —
| —
| —
|
|-
! scope="row"|"Live Wire"
| —
| —
| —
| —
| —
| —
| —
| —
| —
| —
|-
! scope="row"| "The Power of Love" (Remix)
| —
| —
| —
| —
| —
| 9
| —
| —
| —
| 55
|
| rowspan="2"| Jennifer Rush|-
! scope="row"| "Madonna's Eyes"
| —
| —
| —
| —
| —
| —
| —
| —
| —
| 84
|
|-
! scope="row"| "I Come Undone"
| rowspan="3"| 1987
| —
| —
| 28
| —
| 11
| 11
| —
| —
| 9
| 94
|
| rowspan="3"| Heart over Mind|-
! scope="row"| "Flames of Paradise"
| 36
| 31
| —
| 17
| —
| 8
| 14
| —
| 7
| 59
|
|-
! scope="row"| "Heart over Mind"
| —
| —
| 24
| —
| —
| 25
| —
| —
| 29
| —
|
|-
! scope="row"| "Another Way"
| rowspan="3"| 1988
| —
| —
| —
| —
| —
| —
| —
| —
| —
| —
|
| Another Way: Original Motion Picture Soundtrack|-
! scope="row"| "You're My One and Only"
| —
| —
| —
| —
| —
| 27
| —
| —
| 21
| 90
|
| rowspan="3"| Passion|-
! scope="row"| "Keep All the Fires Burning Bright"
| —
| —
| —
| —
| —
| —
| —
| —
| —
| —
|
|-
! scope="row"| "Love Get Ready"
| rowspan="3"| 1989
| —
| —
| —
| —
| —
| —
| —
| —
| —
| —
|
|-
! scope="row"| "Till I Loved You"
| —
| —
| —
| —
| —
| —
| —
| —
| —
| 24
|
| Goya: A Life in Song|-
! scope="row"| "Higher Ground"
| —
| —
| 27
| —
| —
| 54
| —
| —
| —
| 98
|
| rowspan="2"| Wings of Desire|-
! scope="row"| "Wings of Desire"
| rowspan="2"| 1990
| —
| —
| —
| —
| —
| —
| —
| —
| —
| —
|
|-
! scope="row"| "We Are the Strong"
| —
| —
| —
| —
| —
| —
| —
| —
| —
| —
|
| Willy Bogner's Fire, Ice & Dynamite: The Original Soundtrack|-
! scope="row"| "Ave Maria (Survivors of a Different Kind)"
| 1991
| —
| —
| —
| —
| —
| —
| —
| —
| —
| —
|
| The Power of Jennifer Rush|-
! scope="row"| "Never Say Never"
| 1992
| —
| —
| —
| —
| —
| 46
| —
| —
| —
| —
|
| rowspan="3"| Jennifer Rush|-
! scope="row"| "Vision of You"
| rowspan="2"| 1993
| —
| —
| —
| —
| —
| 56
| —
| —
| —
| —
|
|-
! scope="row"| "A Broken Heart"
| —
| —
| —
| —
| —
| 90
| —
| —
| —
| —
|
|-
! scope="row"| "Tears in the Rain"
| rowspan="3"| 1995
| —
| —
| —
| —
| —
| 45
| —
| —
| 26
| —
|
| rowspan="2"| Out of My Hands|-
! scope="row"| "Out of My Hands"
| —
| —
| —
| —
| —
| —
| —
| —
| —
| —
|
|-
! scope="row"| "Das Farbenspiel des Winds"
| —
| —
| —
| —
| —
| 80
| —
| —
| —
| —
|
| Pocahontas: Film Soundtrack (Deutsche Originalversion)|-
! scope="row"| "Credo"
| rowspan="2"| 1997
| —
| —
| 32
| —
| —
| 75
| —
| —
| —
| —
|
| rowspan="2"| Credo|-
! scope="row"| "Sweet Thing"
| —
| —
| —
| —
| —
| —
| —
| —
| —
| —
|
|-
! scope="row"| "The End of a Journey"
| 1998
| —
| —
| —
| —
| —
| —
| —
| —
| —
| —
|
| rowspan="2"| Classics|-
! scope="row"| "Ring of Ice"(Classics version)
| 1999
| —
| —
| —
| —
| —
| —
| —
| —
| —
| —
|
|-
! scope="row"| "Before the Dawn"
| rowspan="2"| 2010
| —
| —
| —
| —
| —
| —
| —
| —
| —
| —
|
| rowspan="2"| Now Is the Hour|-
! scope="row"| "Echoes Love"
| —
| 
| —
| —
| —
| —
| —
| —
| —
| —
|
|-
| colspan="14" style="font-size:90%"| "—" denotes a recording that did not chart or was not released in that territory.
|}

Promotional singles

Videography
Video albumsThe Power of Love: The Complete Video Collection'' (2004)

Music videos
"Ring of Ice" (Version 1) (1984)
"The Power of Love" (1985)
"Ring of Ice" (Version 2) (1985)
"Destiny" (1985)
"Madonna's Eyes" (1986)
"If You're Ever Gonna Lose My Love" (1986)
"I Come Undone" (1987)
"Flames of Paradise" (1987)
"Heart over Mind" (1987)
"You're My One and Only" (1988)
"Love Get Ready" (1989)
"Till I Loved You" (1989)
"Higher Ground" (1989)
"Wings of Desire" (1990)
"We are the Strong" (1990)
"Tears in the Rain" (1995)
"Out of My Hands" (1995)
"Credo" (1997)
"Echoes Love" (2010)

Notes

References

Discographies of American artists
Pop music discographies